Greenville Township is a township in LaMoure County in the U.S. state of North Dakota. Its population at the 2000 Census was 80, with an estimated population of 67 as of 2009.

References

Townships in LaMoure County, North Dakota
Townships in North Dakota